Tippecanoe High School is a public high school in Tipp City, Ohio, a suburb of Dayton. It is the only high school in the Tipp City Exempted Village Schools district. According to US News 2016 Ranking of High Schools, Tippecanoe High School is 95th in Ohio and 1919th in the US. The mascot of the school is the Red Devil. As of 2019-20, the Red Devils are a member of the Miami Valley League (MVL).

The arts

Band

The Tippecanoe High School Band was originally started in 1926. Students have a wide range of musical opportunities to participate in, including Marching Band, Symphonic Winds, Concert Band, two Jazz Bands, Chamber Ensembles, Solo Performances, Musical Pit Orchestra, and Pep Band. The Marching Band hosts an Invitational in September and participates in the OMEA State Marching Band Finals and at Bands of America in Indianapolis.

Other programs
 Choir
 Devilaires
 Theatre
 Visual Arts
 Color Guard
 Winter Guard
 Winter Percussion

Athletics
Athletic teams participate in both boys and girls sports and compete throughout the year (generally divided into Summer, Fall, Winter, and Spring sports).

Boys' Athletics
 Baseball
 Basketball
 Bowling
 Cross Country
 Football
 Golf
 Soccer
 Swimming
 Tennis
 Track & Field
 Wrestling
25 State Placers
27 District Champions
56 Conference Champions
2 top ten finishes at OHSAA State Wrestling Tournament
4 district titles
5 Sectional titles
6 Conference titles

Girls' Athletics
 Basketball
 Bowling
 Cheerleading
 Cross Country
 Golf
 Soccer
 Softball
 Swimming
 Tennis
 Track & Field
 Volleyball

Ohio High School Athletic Association State Championships

 Boys Cross Country - 2014 
 Boys Soccer - 2019

Clubs and activities

Academic Quiz Team
The Tippecanoe HS Academic Quiz Team program was established in the 1995 fall semester.  They have participated on the TV show High Q and are currently tied with Carroll High School and Beavercreek High School for most seasons won at 3 (1996-1997, 2003-2004, 2006–2007).  The team participates in yearly events with members coming and going as their schedules allow.

Other organizations
 Anglers' Outdoors Club
 Astra
 Chess Club
 Destination Imagination
 Drama Club
 Model UN
 National Honor Society
 Newspaper
 Octagon
 Science Fair
 Student Senate
 Varsity T
 Yearbook

Notable alumni
 Steven Reineke - Conductor of The New York Pops.
 Rachael Bade - Political reporter for The Washington Post.

References

External links
 District Website

Tipp City, Ohio
High schools in Miami County, Ohio
Educational institutions established in 1918
Public high schools in Ohio
1918 establishments in Ohio